Drumore is an unincorporated community in Drumore Township in Lancaster County, Pennsylvania, United States. Drumore is located at the intersection of Port Deposit Road and Fishing Creek Road along the east bank of the Susquehanna River at the mouth of Fishing Creek.

References

Unincorporated communities in Lancaster County, Pennsylvania
Unincorporated communities in Pennsylvania